Caesia is a genus of herbs in the family Asphodelaceae, subfamily Hemerocallidoideae, native to Australia, New Guinea, Madagascar and Southern Africa. The mostly 3-lobed seed capsules contain rounded black seeds. The genus was named in honour of Federico Cesi (1585-1630), an Italian scientist.

Species 

 Caesia alpina Hook.f. - alpine grass-lily - New South Wales, Tasmania, Victoria
 Caesia calliantha R.J.F.Hend. - blue grass-lily - New South Wales, Tasmania, Victoria, South Australia
 Caesia capensis (Bolus) Oberm. - Cape Province of South Africa
 Caesia chlorantha F.Muell. - New South Wales, Queensland, Western Australia
 Caesia micrantha Lindl.  - New South Wales, Tasmania, Victoria, South Australia, Western Australia, Queensland
 Caesia occidentalis R.Br.  - Western Australia
 Caesia parviflora R.Br. - pale grass-lily - Queensland, New South Wales, Tasmania, Victoria, South Australia, Western Australia
 †Caesia rigidifolia F.Muell. - Queen Victoria Springs in Western Australia but extinct. Last recorded near Zanthus in 1875. 
 Caesia sabulosa Boatwr. & J.C.Manning - Cape Province
 Caesia setifera Baker - Queensland, Western Australia, Northern Territory, New Guinea
 Caesia subulata Baker - Madagascar
 Caesia viscida Keighery - Western Australia

References

Asphodelaceae genera
Hemerocallidoideae
Taxa named by Robert Brown (botanist, born 1773)